Marcello Bergamo (Ponte di Piave, Veneto, December 16, 1946) was an Italian cyclist, who rode as a professional from 1969 until 1978.

Presently he runs the sports clothing company Bergamo Maglifico Sportivo.

Career
His best results are victories in Milano–Torino in 1973 and two stages in the Tour de Romandie in 1971 and 1973. He also achieved podium finishes in the Italian semi-classics Giro dell'Emilia, Giro del Piemonte, and Giro del Lazio. The most successful years of his career he rode for the cycling team Filotex.

Palmares

References

External links
 Page at CyclingRanking.com
 Page at cyclingarchives.com

Italian male cyclists
1946 births
Cyclists from the Province of Treviso
Living people
20th-century Italian people